Augusta de Wit (25 November 1864 – 9 February 1939) was a Dutch writer, born in the Dutch East Indies and best known for writing about Java.

Early life 
Anna Augusta Henriette de Wit was born in Sibolga, Sumatra, the daughter of Jan Karel de Wit (1819-1884), a colonial official who served as Dutch Consul in Japan, and Anna Maria Johanna de la Couture (1837-1895). She had sisters Louise and Caroline, and brother Karel. She was educated in Utrecht and in England.

Career 
Augusta de Wit began her career as a teacher at her alma mater, a girls' school in Utrecht. She returned to the East Indies in 1894, and taught at a girls' school in Batavia. For health reasons she left the classroom and became a writer, contributing to the Straits Times beginning in 1896. She published a collection of her articles as an illustrated book, Facts and Fancies about Java (1898), noting that "Hollanders do not understand the Javanese, nor do the Javanese understand the Hollanders, in any true sense of the word." 

Further books followed, including the novel Orpheus in de Dessa (1903), Island-India (1923), and De wijdere wereld (1930). She also wrote short stories, and corresponded with D. H. Lawrence about translating his works into Dutch. As literary critic at the Nieuwe Rotterdamsche Courant, de Wit admired the work of Edith Wharton.

Personal life 
Augusta de Wit was ill for several years before she died in 1939, aged 74 years, in Baarn. In recent years, her work is usually mentioned in the context of women writers and Dutch colonialism.

References

External links 

 
 "Balinese Girl in Temple Costume" published by Augusta de Wit, in the Nationaal Museum van Wereldculturen, Amsterdam.

1864 births
1939 deaths
Dutch women writers
People from Sumatra
Dutch literary critics
Dutch women literary critics
Literary translators